Telugu Indian Idol is an Indian Telugu-language music competetion television series and is part of Indian Idol. It is Telugu version of the Pop Idol format. First season of the show was premiered on 25 February 2022 on Aha. BVK Vagdevi was announced as the winner of the first season.

Season 1

Production 
The finale episode of the season was initially scheduled to be soot on 6 June 2022, but was postponed to 7 June 2022.

Judges and presenters 
Sreerama Chandra was signed as the presenter of the first season after becoming the runner-up of the reality show Bigg Boss 5. While, the judges of the first season are Nithya Menen, Karthik and Thaman S. After Karthik was announced as one of the judges, the show faced criticism. Several netizens argued that the he is accused of MeToo and slammed the production for choosing him.

Contestants

Season 2

Contestants

References

External links 

 

Aha (streaming service) original programming
2022 Indian television series debuts
2022 Indian television seasons
Indian television series based on British television series
Telugu Indian Idol
Indian Idol
Telugu-language television shows
Television series by Fremantle (company)
Indian music television series
Indian reality television series